The Wales women's national field hockey team represents Wales in international women's field hockey, with the exception of the Olympic Games when Welsh players are eligible to play for the Great Britain national women's field hockey team as selected. The country's main targets as laid down by Hockey Wales, Wales national governing body for hockey, are the EuroHockey Championships, the FIH World League and the Commonwealth Games.

Tournament record

World Cup
1983 – 12th place

EuroHockey Championship
1987 – 8th place
1991 – 9th place
2003 – 12th place

EuroHockey Championship II
2005 – 7th place
2009 – 
2011 – 8th place
2015 – 5th place
2017 – 4th place
2019 – 5th place
2021 – 4th place

EuroHockey Championship III
2007 – 
2013 –

Commonwealth Games
1998 – 11th place
2010 – 8th place
2014 – 9th place
2018 – 9th place
2022 – 8th place

Hockey World League
2012–13 – Round 1
2016–17 – 22nd place

FIH Hockey Series
2018–19 – Second round

See also
Great Britain women's national field hockey team
Wales men's national field hockey team

References

External links
Wales Hockey
European Hockey Federation

European women's national field hockey teams
Field hockey
National team